CGW may refer to:

 Chicago Great Western Railway, a Class I railroad that linked Chicago, Minneapolis, Omaha, and Kansas City
 Comics' Greatest World, an imprint of Dark Horse Comics
 Computer Gaming World, an American computer game magazine published between 1981 and 2006
 Counsel General for Wales